Francesco Manunta, in Catalan language, Francesc Manunta i Baldino (1928 in Alghero – 1995) was an Italian priest and poet.

Early life 
From 1965 to 1983, he was missionary in Brazil. When he went back to Alghero, he started his activity to promote Catalan language in Alghero. He was president of Òmnium Cultural in Alghero and he received the Creu de Sant Jordi in 1990.

Works
 Catecisme alguerès (1964) with Josep Sanna
 Les veus (1970)
 Aigües vives (1976)
 Llavors de llum (1981)
 Miques de mirall (1988)
 Transparències (1991)
 Cançons i líriques religioses de l'Alguer catalana (1990)

References

Italian male writers
Italian Roman Catholic missionaries
Catalan language activists
People from Alghero
1928 births
1995 deaths
Roman Catholic missionaries in Brazil
Italian expatriates in Brazil
20th-century Italian Roman Catholic priests